Let's Get Together Now is the official local song of the 2002 FIFA World Cup held in South Korea and Japan. Performed by the Supergroup Voice of Korea/Japan (Lena Park and Brown Eyes from South Korea and Sowelu and Chemistry from Japan), it was released in three separate versions: a full Japanese version, a full Korean version (with some English at the end), and a merged version which combines the lyrics of the two versions. The last of the three was included in the official soundtrack album and was performed in the opening ceremonies in Seoul on May 31, 2002.

Composed by Daisuke Kawaguchi and Kim Hyung-Suk and written by Yoshimitsu Sawamoto, Kiyoshi Matsuo, Park, and Kim, the lyrics tell spirit of gathering and coming together as one, as with the theme of the two countries in co-hosting the said event. Although this is not the official theme song (which is Boom by Anastacia), this song proves to be popular.

The single was certified gold by the RIAJ in March 2002.

See also 
 List of FIFA World Cup songs and anthems
 The Official Album of the 2002 FIFA World Cup

References

External links 
 Voice of Korea/Japan - "Let's Get Together Now" (2002 FIFA World Cup Opening Ceremony)
 "Let's Get Together Now" Korean & Japanese Version
 "Let's Get Together Now" Korean Version
 "Let's Get Together Now" Japanese Version

South Korean songs
Japanese songs
FIFA World Cup official songs and anthems